Matt Cockbain (born 19 September 1972) is an Australian rugby union football coach and a former international player. He played over 60 tests for the national team, the Wallabies including winning the 1999 Rugby World Cup. Cockbain was an assistant coach to the Fijian national team on their 2014 end-of-year tour, and the forwards coach at the Melbourne Rebels from 2012 to 2014.

Cockbain began his professional career with the Queensland Reds in 1995. He made his debut for Australia in 1997 at Brisbane in a Test match against France. After a short stint with the Cardiff Blues in 2004, he played with World Corporation in Japan from 2004 to 2006 before returning to Australia to play for the Melbourne Rebels (ARC) team in the Australian Rugby Championship in 2007. He was called up as an injury standby for the 2007 Wallaby World Cup squad.

His brother, Brent Cockbain played rugby union for Wales.

References

External links

1972 births
Australian rugby union players
Australia international rugby union players
Living people
Rugby union flankers
Expatriate rugby union players in Japan
Queensland Reds players
Australian expatriate rugby union players
Expatriate rugby union players in Wales
Australian expatriate sportspeople in Wales
Australian expatriate sportspeople in Japan
Rugby union players from New South Wales